Firefly Aerospace is an American private aerospace firm based in Cedar Park, Texas, that develops launch vehicles for commercial launches to orbit. The company completed its $75 million Series A investment round in May 2021, which was led by DADA Holdings. The current company was formed when the assets of the former company Firefly Space Systems were acquired by EOS Launcher in March 2017, which was then renamed Firefly Aerospace. Firefly's purported purpose is to increase access to space, similar to other NewSpace organizations.

Launch vehicles

Firefly Alpha 

The projected launch cost is US$15 million per launch. Alpha is designed to compete with vehicles like the Polar Satellite Launch Vehicle (PSLV). It utilizes Reaver-1 and Lightning-1 engines and a lightweight carbon composite structure to reduce launch weight, resulting in an improved payload fraction. The rocket performed its first partially successful orbital launch on 1 October 2022, after an unsuccessful first attempt on September 3, 2021.

MLV

Previous designs 
Firefly previously pursued a medium-lift launch vehicle design known as Firefly Beta, which consisted of three Alpha cores strapped together. In October 2019, Firefly announced a partnership with Aerojet Rocketdyne to develop a single core rocket potentially powered by Rocketdyne's AR1 engine. In 2020, the Beta was redesigned to be a scaled up Alpha. The first stage would be  in diameter with 5 Reaver engines capable of delivering 8000 kg to LEO or 5800 kg to SSO inside a  fairing. In October 2021, the first Beta launch was planned for the second half of 2024.

Current design
By August 2022, the concept had undergone another revision. Now known as the Medium Launch Vehicle, or MLV, the rocket is now 4.32 m (14.17 ft) in diameter with 7 Miranda engines, and capable of delivering 14,000 kg to LEO in a 5 m (16.4 ft) fairing. As of March 2023, the first MLV launch is scheduled for 2025.

Antares 300 

Firefly is a subcontractor for the Northrop Grumman Antares series 300, contracted to provide the first stage booster for the Antares rocket. This booster rocket is based on the Firefly Beta first stage, but modified to fit the form factor of the Antares first stage configuration, to fit the same launch mounting and attachments, and the same upper (second) stage.

Firefly Gamma 
Firefly Gamma is a concept of a winged rocket to launch small payloads into orbit. It would be a 2-stage rocket 75% reusable with its first stage landing horizontally at a runway. If built, its first test flights are expected to start in the 2020s.

Lunar landers

Genesis lunar lander 
On June 9, 2019, Firefly Aerospace announced that it had signed an agreement with Israel Aerospace Industries (IAI), which owns the intellectual property of the Beresheet lunar lander design, to build a lunar lander named Genesis based on Beresheet. Genesis was proposed for NASA's Commercial Lunar Payload Services (CLPS) to deliver payloads to the surface of the Moon. If selected, Firefly Genesis would have been launched on a Firefly Beta rocket, or a Falcon 9 rocket in late 2022. Due to changing CLPS specifications, Firefly determined that Genesis no longer fit NASA's requirements and started work on a new lunar lander design called Blue Ghost in 2021.

Blue Ghost lunar lander 

Blue Ghost is a lunar lander designed at Firefly's Cedar Park facility to meet NASA's updated requirements for a CLPS lunar lander. The lander is named after the blue ghost firefly Phausis reticulata.

On February 4, 2021, NASA awarded a CLPS contract worth US$93.3 million to Firefly Aerospace to deliver a suite of 10 science investigations and technology demonstrations to the Moon in 2023. The award is part of the NASA's Commercial Lunar Payload Services (CLPS) initiative, in which NASA is securing the service of commercial partners to quickly land science and technology payloads on the lunar surface as part of the Artemis program.

Firefly Aerospace is the prime contractor responsible for end-to-end delivery services, including payload integration, launch from Earth, landing on the Moon, and mission operations. Subcontractors include SolAero By Rocket Lab, providing the solar panels, and ASI by Rocket Lab, providing the lander flight software, ground software, GN&C software, trajectory design, orbit determination, and avionics/flight software testbed integration. This is the sixth award for lunar surface delivery under the CLPS initiative, and the first delivery awarded to Firefly Aerospace. Firefly's Cedar Park facility will serve as the company's mission operations center for the 2023 delivery and the location of payload integration, with Rocket Lab serving as the backup mission operations center. 

The mission is planned to land at Mare Crisium, a 500-km-wide basin. Instruments will gather data to provide insight into the Moon's regolith – loose, fragmented rock and soil – properties, geophysical characteristics, and the interaction of solar wind and Earth's magnetic field, helping to prepare for human missions to the lunar surface.

The payloads, collectively expected to total  in mass, include:

 The Regolith Adherence Characterization (RAC), which will determine how lunar regolith sticks to a range of materials exposed to the Moon's environment during landing and lander operations. Components will be derived from the Materials International Space Station Experiment (MISSE) facility currently on the International Space Station (ISS).
 The Next Generation Lunar Retroreflectors (NGLR), which will serve as a target for lasers on Earth to precisely measure the distance between Earth and the Moon. The retroreflector that will fly on this mission also will provide data that could be used to understand various aspects of the lunar interior and address fundamental physics questions.
 The Lunar Environment Heliospheric X-ray Imager (LEXI), which will capture images of the interaction of Earth's magnetosphere with the flow of charged particles from the Sun, called the solar wind.
 The Reconfigurable, Radiation Tolerant Computer System (RadPC), which aims to demonstrate a radiation-tolerant computing technology. Due to the Moon's lack of atmosphere and magnetic field, radiation from the Sun will be a challenge for electronics. This investigation also will characterize the radiation effects on the lunar surface.
 The Lunar Magnetotelluric Sounder (LMS), which is designed to characterize the structure and composition of the Moon's mantle by studying electric and magnetic fields. The investigation will make use of a flight-spare magnetometer, a device that measures magnetic fields, originally made for the Mars Atmosphere and Volatile EvolutioN (MAVEN) spacecraft currently orbiting Mars.
 The Lunar Instrumentation for Subsurface Thermal Exploration with Rapidity (LISTER), which is designed to measure heat flow from the interior of the Moon. The probe will attempt to drill  into the lunar regolith to investigate the Moon's thermal properties at different depths.
 The Lunar PlanetVac (LPV), which is designed to acquire lunar regolith from the surface and transfer it to other instruments that would analyze the material or put it in a container that another spacecraft could return to Earth.
 Stereo CAmeras for Lunar Plume Surface Studies (SCALPSS 1.1), which will capture video and still images of the area under the lander from when the engine plume first disturbs the lunar surface through engine shutdown. Long-focal-length cameras will determine the pre-landing surface topography. Photogrammetry will be used to reconstruct the changing surface during landing. Understanding the physics of rocket exhaust on the regolith, and the displacement of dust, gravel, and rocks is critical to understanding how to best avoid kicking up surface materials during the terminal phase of flight/landing on the Moon and other celestial bodies.
 The Electrodynamic Dust Shield (EDS), which will generate a non-uniform electric field using varying high voltage on multiple electrodes. This traveling field, in turn, carries away the particles and has potential applications in thermal radiators, spacesuit fabrics, visors, camera lenses, solar panels, and many other technologies.
 The Lunar GNSS Receiver Experiment (LuGRE), which is based on GPS. LuGRE will continue to extend the reach of GPS signals and, if successful, be the first to discern GPS signals at lunar distances.

On May 20, 2021, Firefly selected SpaceX's Falcon 9 as the launch vehicle for the first mission, as its own Alpha rocket does not have the performance or payload volume needed to launch Blue Ghost. Firefly's future Beta launch vehicle is expected to support future Blue Ghost missions.

On April 26, 2022, Firefly announced the completion of the Integration Readiness Review (IRR) for the first Blue Ghost lander, M1, with the launch now expected to occur in 2024.

Engines 
To date, Firefly is the only organization to develop an orbital-class rocket engine utilizing the combustion tap-off cycle, and the only organization to develop a kerolox tap-off cycle engine.

This engine type eliminates traditional gas generators and instead opts to "tap off" the main combustion chamber, utilizing the high heat and pressure within it to drive the pumps. 

This provides a slight increase in specific impulse and results in a dramatically simpler and lighter engine, in exchange for increased engineering complexity and requiring more exotic materials in order to handle the high heat and pressure. The startup sequence is also more challenging.

As a result of these challenges, tap-off has been largely ignored, with the only other engines using it being the Rocketdyne J-2S and Blue Origin BE-3.

Firefly designed both Reaver and Lightning in close cooperation with Yuzhnoye State Design Office in Ukraine, and much of the engine powerheads were produced by Yuzhmash in Dnipro, Ukraine. It is unclear how much this will be impacted going forward as a result of the 2022 Russian invasion of Ukraine.

Reaver 
Reaver is an expendable rocket engine designed for use on Firefly's Alpha rocket. It has a thrust of 184 kN and a specific impulse of 295.6 sec. It is powered by RP-1 and liquid oxygen as its fuel and oxidizer, respectively. Reaver is fixed-throttle, meaning it runs at full power from ignition to first stage shutdown (eschewing the typical throttle-down performed by much vehicles at Max-Q to reduce aerodynamic loads) and is ignited with the pyrophoric combination TEA-TEB (also used on the SpaceX Merlin and Rocketdyne F-1). It utilizes a pintle-type injector.

Lightning 
Lightning is a vacuum-optimized engine designed for use on the upper stage of Firefly's Alpha rocket. Lightning has a thrust of 70.1 kN and an ISP of 322 sec. Like Reaver, Lightning uses RP-1 and LOX as its propellants as well as the same combustion tap-off cycle. It is also re-lightable for missions requiring multiple upper stage burns. It uses Firefly's patented "Crossfire" injector design.

Miranda 
Miranda is Firefly's next-generation rocket engine designed for use on the first stage of its upcoming MLV launch vehicle, in addition to Northrop Grumman's Antares 330. Miranda has a thrust of 1,023 kN and an ISP of 305 sec. Miranda uses the same RP-1 and LOX propellants as Firefly's Reaver and Lightning engines, as well as the combustion tap-off cycle.

Miranda was formerly known as "Reaver 2."

Viranda 
Viranda is a vacuum-optimized version of Miranda designed for the upper stage of Firefly's MLV vehicle. Viranda has a vacuum thrust of 1,097 kN and an ISP of 325 sec. Viranda uses RP-1 and LOX as its propellants, and is re-lightable for missions requiring multiple upper stage burns.

In Space Transportation 

Firefly is developing the Space Utility Vehicle (SUV), a reusable electric spacecraft designed to move payloads and satellites from one orbit to another within LEO, GEO, and cislunar space. SUV would allow smaller rockets (such as Firefly's own Alpha) to deliver larger payloads to more difficult orbits, and enable satellite relocation, servicing, mission extension, and deorbiting.

Production 
Firefly headquarters and factory are located in Cedar Park, Texas. The company has access to about 50,000 ft2 of manufacturing facilities for building composite and metallic components in-house. Firefly will use leased launch sites in California (Vandenberg Space Launch Complex 2) and in Florida (SLC-20).

History

Firefly Space Systems

Early growth 
Firefly Space Systems began as a startup in January 2014 by Tom Markusic, P.J. King and Michael Blum and a small group of entrepreneurs who self-funded the company. In November 2014, Firefly moved its headquarters from Hawthorne, California to Austin-suburb Cedar Park, Texas.

In 2014, Firefly purchased fiber-winding equipment for manufacturing composite cryotanks that would be built using an out-of-autoclave process. Prototype tanks were tested at Marshall Space Flight Center of NASA in mid-2014.

The Firefly Alpha design was revealed in July 2014. Firefly's objective was to be cash-flow positive by 2018, based on anticipated small-satellite business. Firefly had signed an agreement with Space Florida to launch from the Florida "Space Coast".

Firefly performed its first hot-fire engine test of the "Firefly Rocket Engine Research 1" (FRE-R1) on September 10, 2015. The initial demonstration launch of the Firefly Alpha was planned to be as early as 2016.

Litigation and closure 
In December 2014, Tom Markusic's former employer Virgin Galactic alleged he had illegally provided Virgin intellectual property to the Alpha development team. Virgin also alleged that Markusic had "destroyed storage devices, disposed of computers, and reformatted hard drives to cover the tracks of his misappropriation of Virgin Galactic information". In August 2016, an independent arbitrator confirmed that Markusic had destroyed evidence. Thereafter, a major European investor backed down, leaving Firefly without sufficient money to proceed. The company furloughed its entire staff in October 2016. According to Markusic, the investor's drawback was not related to the litigation but to Brexit. Within the same month, Virgin Orbit filed suit in Los Angeles County Superior Court against Firefly and two of its officers. By December 1, 2016, Firefly Space Systems had permanently ceased engineering work.

In March 2017, it was announced that "virtually all" of the assets of Firefly would be sold at auction, organized by EOS Launcher, Inc., who had previously bought a US$1 million promissory note issued by Firefly to Space Florida and induced a foreclosure.

Firefly Aerospace 
After going bankrupt and being liquidated in March 2017, the company was re-created as Firefly Aerospace by Noosphere Ventures, who bought out the assets of former Firefly Space Systems. The owner of Noosphere Ventures, Max Polyakov, committed to fully fund Firefly through at least its first two launches. The plans for engine development were significantly altered by the new management, and the revised Alpha vehicle design featured a pump-fed engine and removed the aerospike configuration. The reorganization initially delayed development by approximately a year, with the first launch expected, in 2019.

Development of engines and structures resumed in 2017 and Firefly Aerospace performed multiple hot-fire tests of its Lightning-1 second stage engine on its existing horizontal test stand. A vertical stage test stand was nearing completion and stage testing was expected to begin in the second half of 2018.

On May 17, 2018, Firefly Aerospace opened a Research and development (R&D) center in the city of Dnipro, Ukraine. The Firefly R&D center was announced to become, over time, a place of work for more than 150 employees, and is equipped with the largest 3D-printer in Ukraine, intended for industrial manufacturing of high-quality metal parts.

On October 10, 2018, Firefly Aerospace and smallsat developer York Space Systems announced a partnership to offer customers a combined package of satellite and launch services.

In November 2018, it was announced that NASA selected Firefly Aerospace as one of nine companies able to bid for Commercial Lunar Payload Services (CLPS), where the company would propose a robotic lunar lander called Firefly Genesis.

In February 2019, the company announced that it would develop manufacturing facilities and a launch site at Cape Canaveral. They have leased a private launch pad in Florida — the former Space Launch Complex 20 (SLC-20) which had been used by the U.S. Air Force in the 1950s through 1996 — from the U.S. government and they also have a similar lease arrangement on the U.S. West Coast.

In December 2019, a group of primary shareholders of Firefly Space Systems filed a lawsuit alleging fraud and intentional bankruptcy of the company by Tom Markusic. According to the defendants, including Polyakov, the lawsuit was provocative and the plaintiffs' claims unfounded, three years after the updated Firefly Aerospace was a significant success. The lawsuit is pending.

In February 2021, NASA awarded approximately US$93.3 million to Firefly Aerospace to develop exploration technologies for Artemis Commercial Moon Delivery in 2023.

Firefly launched its first test flight on September 3, 2021. The Firefly Alpha rocket experienced an anomaly during ascent, and the Range terminated the flight using the explosive Flight Termination System (FTS).

In late November 2021, Maxim Polyakov received a letter from the US Committee on Foreign Investment (CFIUS) asking Polyakov and his investment firm Noosphere Venture Partners to sell a stake in Firefly (nearly 50%) for national security reasons. Polyakov denied the threat to US national security, but agreed to comply. Noosphere Ventures has announced that it will hire an investment banking firm to sell. The future of the Firefly R&D center in Ukraine is still unknown, it will probably be closed.

On February 24, 2022, it was announced that Polyakov and his company Noosphere will sell their stake in Firefly to AE Industrial Partners.

In August 2022, Northrop Grumman announced that it had contracted Firefly Aerospace to build the Antares rocket's new 300-series' first stage, which is similar to Firefly's in-development Beta launch vehicle, and features the same composite structures as well as seven Miranda engines producing  of thrust — substantially greater than the previous 200-series first stage. Northrop Grumman states that the new first stage substantially increases the mass capability of Antares.

On October 1, 2022, Firefly successfully launched the Alpha rocket on its second test flight “To the Black” from Space Launch Complex 2 from Vandenberg Space Force Base. Alpha completed all objectives for the mission, becoming the first orbital rocket to be powered by a tap-off cycle engine.

See also 

 Relativity Space
 Rocket Lab

References

External links 
 

Aerospace companies of the United States
Companies based in Texas
Private spaceflight companies
Commercial launch service providers
Technology companies established in 2017
American companies established in 2017
2017 establishments in Texas
Commercial Lunar Payload Services